Norman F. Ellison (1893–1976) was an English radio presenter and author who made radio programmes about nature and the countryside for the BBC's Children's Hour, under the pseudonym Nomad the Naturalist, and wrote on the same subjects both as Nomad and in his own name.
 
Born in Liverpool in 1893, he signed up as a private in the 1/6th Battalion, King's Liverpool Regiment, at the outbreak of World War I, and served in the trenches in Belgium. He saw action on The Somme and at Flanders but was discharged in 1917 suffering from trench foot. His war diaries were published in 1997.

In later life, he lived at West Kirby, on the Wirral Peninsula, Cheshire. He and Eric Hosking would watch birds together at Hilbre Island. Six of his books were illustrated by his friend Charles Tunnicliffe.

Bibliography 

 Down Nature's Byways, University of London Press, 1938.
 Out of Doors with Nomad (illustrated by Tunnicliffe), University of London Press, 1947.
 Our British birds and beasts (photographs by Hosking, drawings by Alfed K. Wiffen), Open Air Books, 1947
 Republished by Countrygoer Books, 1953
 Wild Life in Britain, Open Air Books
 Roving with Nomad (illustrated by Tunnicliffe), University of London Press, 1949.
 Adventuring with Nomad (illustrated by Tunnicliffe), University of London Press, 1950.
 Northwards with Nomad (illustrated by Tunnicliffe), University of London Press, 1951.
 Over the Hills with Nomad (illustrated by Tunnicliffe), University of London Press.
 Wandering with Nomad (illustrated by Tunnicliffe), University of London Press.
 A check list of the fauna of Lancashire and Cheshire: Mammalia, Reptilia, Amphibia, 1959
 The Wirral Peninsula, Hale, 1970 
 Remembrances of Hell, the Great War diary of naturalist, writer and broadcaster Norman F. Ellison – 'Nomad' of the BBC, edited by David R. Lewis, Airlife, 1997

See also 

 George Bramwell Evens aka Romany.

References

External links 
(Both include photographs of Ellison)
Nomad Books on the Charles Tunnicliffe Society website
The Hilbre Party
Reference to Norman Ellison's Year of Death

English nature writers
English children's writers
British radio personalities
People from West Kirby
1893 births
1976 deaths
Children's Hour presenters
British Army personnel of World War I
King's Regiment (Liverpool) soldiers
Military personnel from Liverpool